Mendooran (pronunciation: men-door-an) is a small town adjacent to the Castlereagh River in the Warrumbungle Shire of central western New South Wales, Australia. The town lies at an altitude of 271 metres above sea level, 348 kilometres west of Sydney, 75 kilometres from Dubbo and 71 kilometres southeast of Coonabarabran. At the 2011 census, Mendooran had a population of 302 people. The Castlereagh Highway also runs through the town, changing its name to Bandulla Street in the centre.

History 

The district was inhabited by the Wiradjuri tribe before white settlement. The first European to visit the area was surveyor John Evans who came as close as 10 kilometres from Mendooran in 1815. Two years later it was John Oxley's group that passed through the area while conducting one of the first inland expeditions. It is believed that the name derived from that of a local Aboriginal tribal leader named either "Mundo" or "Mundoo".  Lucerne, wheat and sheep were established on the station in later years.

The small village grew in the 1860s on the old station near the bridge which passed over the Castlereagh River. As at 1866 there were 24 residents recorded in the area. The village was called Mundooran until the arrival of the railway around 1915 when the name was changed to Mendooran.

The John Bull Inn was erected to serve the passing traffic of the 1860s. A bridge was erected over the Castlereagh River in 1869 which increased the road traffic and contributed to local development. The town was laid out in 1881 with a school, police station and courthouse being built.

The Robertson Land Act of 1893 broke up the larger squatting runs and closer settlement then came about.

Mendooran hosts an annual agricultural show. It also hosts an annual Raceday Festival in September that sees the town population swell to above 400 as race-goers from around the world visit.

In February 2019 Mendooran was experiencing severe shortages of water and had been placed on level six water restrictions, the highest level of restrictions mandated in NSW.

Mendooran formerly had a rugby league team, the Mendooran Tigers, who competed in the Group 14 Rugby League competition.

Notable People

Notable people from Mendooran include-

Ron Quinton - Successful Jockey and Horse trainer
Katrina Gibbs - Commonwealth Games High Jump Champion 1978, Australian National High Jump Champion 1978 and 1982
Gail Neall  - Gold Medal Winning Medley Swimmer 1972 Olympics in Record Time - Taught at Mendooran Central School (Primary) in the 1970s. Emeritus Professor Stephen Dinham OAM - international education expert - taught at Mendooran Central School 1976-1981.

References

External links

Towns in New South Wales
Warrumbungle Shire